Julia Mary Fownes Somerville,  (born 14 July 1947) is an English television news reader and reporter who has worked for the BBC and ITN.

Early life and education
Somerville was born in Wells, Somerset, the granddaughter of Admiral of the Fleet Sir James Fownes Somerville (1882–1949) of Dinder House in Somerset. She was educated at Airthrie Preparatory School in Cheltenham and Headington School in Oxford, graduating (1969) from the University of Sussex (BA English Literature).

Career
After graduation, Somerville joined publisher IPC, working on Homes and Gardens magazine, a Women's Journal, the PR section of Woman's Own. Then for two years she was editor of a computer group's house magazine.

Somerville joined the BBC in 1972 as a sub-editor in the radio newsroom, and then became a reporter in 1978. In 1981, she became Labour Affairs correspondent and joined BBC Television News in 1983, co-presenting the BBC Nine O'Clock News.

Somerville moved to ITN in 1987, where she co-presented the Lunchtime News and also deputised as presenter of News at Ten. In addition she presented 3D, a weekly ITV current affairs programme. She was diagnosed with a brain tumour in August 1992 and after neurosurgery recovered well and was a member of the News at Ten team until the programme ended a 32-year run in 1999. She remained at ITN until October 2001, presenting the ITV Lunchtime News with John Suchet and was the launch anchor for the ITN News Channel.

Between 1999 and 2001, Somerville presented the daily LBC radio show London Life, a two-hour programme devoted to interviews with diverse artists.

Somerville has a lifelong interest in painting and in 2001 was a member of the judging panel for the National Portrait Gallery's BP Portrait of the Year; she has also served as a judge for several years on the RIBA Annual Architecture Award Panels. On 18 September 2003, Somerville was appointed Chair of the Advisory Committee of the Government Art Collection, for a period of four years.

As part of ITN's "Famous Five" with Gordon Honeycombe, Martyn Lewis, Selina Scott and Anna Ford, Somerville was brought back to the screen for one week in September 2005 for ITN's 50th anniversary.

In 2010, Somerville returned to television news as a presenter on BBC News. She also occasionally presented BBC Breakfast. In January 2011, Somerville started as an occasional relief presenter of the BBC Weekend News on BBC One.

Also in 2010, Somerville took the lead in an experimental film Facade by artist and filmmaker Phil Coy. Her distinctive vocal delivery articulated the deconstruction of London's glass architecture and was screened nationally and internationally at The Whitstable Biennale, The South London Gallery, The Whitechapel Gallery and New York Armoury Show.

Somerville joined Rip Off Britain when the show returned in Autumn 2011 for its third series. She replaced Jennie Bond to host along with Angela Rippon and Gloria Hunniford. Together, they also presented Charlie's Consumer Angels.

On 15 June 2013, it was announced that Somerville was to receive an OBE for services to art as part of the Queen's Birthday Honours. Somerville received this award in recognition for her work chairing the Advisory Committee on the Government Art Collection. In September 2017 Somerville was a contestant on Celebrity Masterchef on BBC One.

Personal life
Somerville has been married three times:
Stephen Band (1970–1975)
Ray Gowdridge (1984–1992)
Sir Jeremy Dixon 

Somerville has two children with Gowdridge: Joseph (born 1983) and Rachael (born 1988).

Somerville suffered a brain tumour in 1992, for which she successfully underwent neurosurgery. As a result, she agreed to become a patron of the Different Strokes charity.

Allegations
In 1995, Julia Somerville and Jeremy Dixon were arrested by the Metropolitan Police after sending photos to be printed at a branch of the pharmacy  Boots in London. One photograph involved Somerville's 7-year-old daughter naked in a bathtub. When Dixon arrived at Boots to collect the prints the police were waiting and later his and Somerville's house was searched but nothing was seized. Both suspects were placed on police bail pending further enquiries; later the allegations were dropped.

Stalkers
In August 2001, 47-year-old David Hughes of north London was convicted of harassment after sending 390 obscene letters and specifically moving close to Somerville over a 12-year period. Hughes was found guilty of one charge under Section Two of the Harassment Act, and the judge made a hospital order under the Mental Health Act 1983. Deputy District Judge Javaid Azam subsequently issued an indefinite restraining order banning Hughes from ever contacting the journalist again. It also became known that, in 1995, Somerville took out a court injunction to stop sound engineer Geoffrey Brewis contacting her. She said he had visited her home, followed her and made nuisance phone calls.

References

External links

 Article on conviction of David Hughes
 2003 Announcement of appointment as Chair of the Advisory Committee of the Government Art Collection, 18 September 2003
 Different Strokes charity
 Julia Somerville defends 'innocent family photos'

1947 births
Living people
People from Wells, Somerset
People educated at Headington School
Alumni of the University of Sussex
British television newsreaders and news presenters
English reporters and correspondents
English television journalists
English women journalists
BBC newsreaders and journalists
ITN newsreaders and journalists
ITV regional newsreaders and journalists
Officers of the Order of the British Empire
British women television journalists
British women radio presenters